Kopernika street is located in central Bydgoszcz. Several buildings on Kopernika Street are registered on the Kuyavian-Pomeranian Voivodeship Heritage List. The street is named for Nicolaus Copernicus (1473  1543).

Location
Kopernika Street is located in the eastern part of central Bydgoszcz. The street runs between Ossoliński Alley and Staszica and Paderewskiego Streets. It is close to the precinct of the Pomeranian Philharmonic orchestra.

Naming
The name of the street has changed over time:
 Eigenheimm Straße A and then Hindenburg straße (1914  1920);
 Ulica Kopernika (1920  1939);
 Bismarck Straße (1939  1945) after Otto von Bismarck;
 Ulica Kopernika (1945 onwards).

History

In the early 20th century, Bydgoszcz was called "Bromberg". A large distinct area developed east of the town centre. This area was delineated by Ossoliński Alley, Adam Mickiewicz Alley and Markwarta, Paderewskiego and Staszica streets. The area lay north of a Christian cemetery which became Ludowy Park, on Jagiellońska street.

In 1906, the Emperor Wilhelm Royal Institute of Agriculture, (Kaiser Wilhelm's Institut für Landwirtschaft zu Bromberg) was constructed to the east of the area. At the same time, between 1905 and 1907, the Royal School of Bromberg (Stadt Real Schule) was constructed to the west of the area. This became the Copernicanum building. Between 1903 and 1907, most of the tenements on Adam Mickiewicz Alley were completed. This formed the north boundary of the area. Between 1910 and 1912, the People's School for Boys (Bürgerschule) was formed on the western boundary. It became High School Nr.6.

The resulting triangular area was then further developed as the Sielanka. In December 1912, Josef Stübben (1845  1936) made a sketch for the area. The project was led by Heinrich Metzger, and urban engineer. The surveyor was Bernhard Hirsch.

In the draft, the area was divided into seven irregularly shaped parts. Five of the parts were devoted to the construction of small houses. These parts were near what became Asnyka Street and the southern part of Paderewskiego Street.

The Copernicanum building was built on Staszica Street but the south western tip of the area near Markwarta street remained available for development. At the time, this land was the property of the Province of Posen. It later became a square named after Leszek the White (1124  1227), a Polish prince.

In the 1920s, fifty plots for building were defined. Their land areas varied from 600 to 1400 m2. The first house to be built in Sielanka became 5 Kopernika Street. During World War I, construction ceased.

In 1925, the town allowed the resumption of construction and encouraged the project with generous loans and appropriate regulations. Local workers were employed. Between 1914 and 1945, the town issued forty-eight building permits. Thirty-six of these were issued between 1927 and 1933.

Places and buildings

Copernicanum building

The Copernicum building appears on the Kuyavian-Pomeranian Voivodeship Heritage List, Nr.601363, Reg.A/784 (May 5, 1992) It was constructed between 1903 and 1906 by Carl Zaar and Rudolf Vahl. The building is designed in the Art Nouveau (Secession) style.

The Copernicum building has had several occupants and owners. These include a Prussian realschule; a Copernicus High School for mathematics and natural sciences (1923); and a military hospital during the German occupation (1939  1945). Since 2005, the owner has been the Kazimierz Wielki University (after Casimir III the Great (1330  1370)).

Kopernika Square
Kopernika Square is a green area landscaped in 1973. Its statuary includes a metal sculpture of a female figure by Maria Chudoba-Wiśniewska, a mid-20th century sculptor of Poznań. The sculpture weighs 864 kg and is 4,57m tall. The sculpture was erected during the National Open Air Sculpture Festival (Ogólnopolski Plener Rzeźbiarski) which took place from August to September, 1973. Round shaped stones can be found on the grass, positioned  on ellipse rings surrounding the statue: they represent the planets of the Solar System in orbit, including the Sun and the Moon.

House at 1 Asnyka street, corner with Kopernika street
In 1932, the house on the corner of Asnyka Street and Kopernika Street was designed, built and occupied by the architect Bogdan Raczkowski (1888  1939) in 1932. It is designed in the Functionalist style. In 1921, Rackowski became a member of the Bydgoszcz municipal council. In December 1922, he became a member of the City Development Committee. In 1934, Raczkowski retired. His wife Maria, his daughter Danuta and he were arrested and shot on October 4, 1939, in the forest, north of Bydgoszcz. His brother Tadeusz was murdered later the same month in the Valley of Death.

House at 3 Kopernika street
3 Kopernika Street on the corner with Asnyka Street was constructed between 1933 and 1935. It was designed by Paweł Wawrzon in the Functionalist style. The large villa has a massive avant-corps which carries a balcony. On both street elevations there are ample shed dormers overhanging the gable. The entrance has a delicate transom light, topped by an oeil-de-boeuf and a springline window.

Building at 5  7 Kopernika street
The large house at 5  7 Kopernika Street was built between 1914 and 1916 by Rudolf Kern. It was designed in the early modernist style. The house was built for the Secretary of the Bydgoszcz Regency, Ernest Werner. Later, another floor was added. The house had a family area on the ground floor with five bedrooms above and servants' quarters in the basement.

The house has two avant-corps. One is on the main elevation topped by a balcony. The other one is on the side. It is curved with thin and tall openings. At the gable, a large dormer is situated between two kernel and eyelid dormers. The entrance has a semi-circular transom light, and two pilasters, one on either side.

House at 7a Kopernika street
The villa at 7a was built between 1933 and 1935. It was designed by Bolesław Polakiewicz. in the functionalist style. Polakiewicz designed 9 buildings Kopernika Street and Ossoliński Alley. The villa demonstrates cubic or rectangular forms, enhanced by curves and openings.

Villa at 9 Kopernika Street
9 Kopernika Street was built between 1932 and 1933. It was another design by Bolesław Polakiewicz in the functionalist style. The villa is near the corner with Ossoliński Alley.

Villa at 10 Kopernika street
10 Kopernika Street was built on the corner of Szenwalda Street between 1930 and 1931. It was designed by Stanisław Mankowski in a Polish national style with elements of functionalism. The house became a local branch of the Deutsche Bank. In 2005, the building underwent renovation.
The main architectural elements of the building are the entrances on both streets, the avant-corps and the gables.

House at 12 Kopernika street
12 Kopernika Street was built between 1932 and 1936. It was designed in the functionalist style by engineer A. Knauff from Warsaw

House at 14 Kopernika street
14 Kopernika Street was built in 1934 in the functionalist style. The house has its original vertical glass opening overhanging the entrance which allows light to enter each floor.

House at 16 Kopernika Street
The villa was built in 1933 in an early modernist style. It was listed on the Kuyavian-Pomeranian Voivodeship heritage list as number 601364, registration A/61/1-2, 20 January 2002.

The villa was commissioned by Antoni Weynerowski, the owner of a successful shoe factory, LEO. The shoe factory became KOBRA. The house was a wedding gift to his son, Witold and his wife Julia née Kessler. She was from the Netherlands, the daughter of a rich merchant and so the roof was designed in the Dutch style of de l'Orme. The villa was surrounded by beautiful gardens. After World War II, the villa became the property of the city and became a kindergarten for the children of members of the police force.

See also

 Bydgoszcz
 Bydgoszcz Architects (1850-1970s)
 Pomeranian Philharmonic
 St. Vincent de Paul Basilica Minor in Bydgoszcz
 Kołłątaja street in Bydgoszcz
 High School No. 6, Bydgoszcz

References

External links
  Copernicanum on Kazimierz Wielki University site web

Bibliography
  
  

Cultural heritage monuments in Bydgoszcz
Streets and squares in Bydgoszcz
Villas in Bydgoszcz